Zinc finger and BTB domain-containing protein 7A is a protein that in humans is encoded by the ZBTB7A gene.

Interactions
ZBTB7A has been shown to interact with BCL6.

See also
 Zbtb7

References

Further reading

External links 
 
 

Transcription factors